Independent invention may refer to:

 Independent inventor, a person who creates inventions independently, rather than for an employer
 Multiple discovery, the hypothesis that most scientific discoveries and inventions are made independently and more or less simultaneously by multiple scientists and inventors